The 1982 Big East men's basketball tournament took place at the Hartford Civic Center in Hartford, Connecticut.  It is a single-elimination tournament with three rounds.  Villanova had the best regular season conference record and received the #1 seed.  It was also the last conference post-season tournament before moving to its permanent home, Madison Square Garden, the following season.

Georgetown defeated Villanova in the championship game 72–54, to claim its second Big East tournament Championship.

Bracket

Awards
Most Valuable Player: Eric Floyd, Georgetown

All Tournament Team
 John Bagley, Boston College
 Patrick Ewing, Georgetown
 Eric Floyd, Georgetown
 Ed Pinckney, Villanova
 Leo Rautins, Syracuse
 Eric Smith, Georgetown

References

External links
 

Tournament
Big East men's basketball tournament
Basketball competitions in Hartford, Connecticut
College basketball tournaments in Connecticut
Big East men's basketball tournament
Big East men's basketball tournament
20th century in Hartford, Connecticut